The Ariston Theatre is a cinema in Sanremo, Italy. It has been the venue of the annual Sanremo Music Festival competitions since 1977.

External links

Teatro Ariston

Cinemas in Italy
Buildings and structures in Sanremo
Sanremo Music Festival